Karofsky is a Jewish surname, deriving from the Israelite priestly “Kohen” class. Notable people with the surname include:

 Dave Karofsky, Glee character
 Jill Karofsky (born 1966), justice on the Wisconsin Supreme Court
 Paul Karofsky, Glee character